The UK National Authority for Counter Eavesdropping is a part of FCDO services. It provides technical security support for the British government, British armed forces and friendly foreign governments. The aim of UK NACE is to help develop the standards for government technical security, provides training and mentoring to national and international partners and carries out research and development of new threats and countermeasure technologies.

History 
UK NACE evolved from the Diplomatic Wireless Service  of Bletchley Park in the 1940s. It started in 1945 after it was found that British embassies in the USSR were under technical espionage. The Foreign secretary at the time, Ernest Bevin sent a group of Post Office engineers to certain locations to do “conservative electrical maintenance” on the telephone and telegraphy systems, and “some preventative work such as anti-eavesdropping”.

In 1958, UK NACE was recognised as a national authority by the Cabinet Office. From 1960, UK NACE was a part of MI5 before moving back to the Foreign, Commonwealth and Development office in 1969. In 2008, FCDO services became a trading fund, allowing UK NACE to offer their services to other government departments, law enforcement and some companies.

In 2020, UK NACE became a public authority under schedule 4 of the Investigatory Powers Act, with the power to authorise collection of communications data in support of national security.

Operations 
UK NACE main aims are to ensure that the most sensitive, classified areas within the UK government estate are protected. Their services include:

 vulnerability analysis
 inspections
 defensive monitoring
 construction security
 installations
 support for UK government at national and international conferences

References 

Foreign, Commonwealth and Development Office
Security organizations